Mound Haven is an unincorporated community in Brookville Township, Franklin County, Indiana. The historic Little Cedar Grove Baptist Church is located in Mound Haven.

Geography

References

Unincorporated communities in Franklin County, Indiana
Unincorporated communities in Indiana